The Argentina Range is a mountain range of rock peaks and bluffs,  long, lying  east of the northern part of Forrestal Range in the northeastern portion of the Pensacola Mountains of Antarctica. Discovered and photographed on January 13, 1956, in the course of a US Navy transcontinental nonstop plane flight from McMurdo Sound to Weddell Sea and return.

Named by the Advisory Committee on Antarctic Names after Argentina, which for many years from 1955 maintained a scientific station on the Filchner Ice Shelf at the General Belgrano or Ellsworth Station site. The entire Pensacola Mountains were mapped by United States Geological Survey in 1967 and 1968 from ground surveys and from US Navy tricameral photographs taken in 1964.

Features
Geographical features include:

Schneider Hills

Panzarini Hills

Other features

 Blackwall Ice Stream
 Recovery Glacier
 San Martín Glacier
 Support Force Glacier
 Whichaway Nunataks

Further reading 
 Gunter Faure, Teresa M. Mensing, The Transantarctic Mountains: Rocks, Ice, Meteorites and Water, P 246
 RYSZARD WRONA, Cambrian microfossils from glacial erratics of King George Island, Antarctica, Acta Palaeontologica Polonica 49 (1): 13–56.

External links 

 Argentina Range on USGS website
 Argentina Range on AADC website
 Argentina Range on SCAR website

References
 

Mountain ranges of Queen Elizabeth Land
.